La Mejor Colección (Eng.: "The Best Collection") is a two disc compilation album released by Marco Antonio Solís on December 11, 2007.

Track listing

Disc 1

All songs written and composed by Marco Antonio Solís

Disc 2

All songs written and composed by Marco Antonio Solís except for Casas de Carton

Charts

Weekly charts

Year-end charts

Sales and certifications

US Sales as of July 11, 2007: 43,511 copies

References

External links
Official website

2007 compilation albums
Marco Antonio Solís compilation albums
Fonovisa Records compilation albums